Blackmon Peak, also known as Blackman Peak, at  above sea level is a peak in the White Cloud Mountains of Idaho. The peak is located in Sawtooth National Recreation Area in Custer County  from Castle Peak, its line parent.  It is named for George Blackmon (b.1854), freed slave and mining pioneer.

See also
D. O. Lee Peak
Born Lakes
Chamberlain Basin
List of lakes of the White Cloud Mountains

References

Mountains of Custer County, Idaho
Mountains of Idaho
Sawtooth National Forest